Louise Rutkowski (born 1964) is a Scottish singer who rose to prominence as part of the 4AD music project This Mortal Coil.

Early life
At 19, Louise was signed to CBS Records, recording three singles and an album with soul producer Pete Wingfield with the band Sunset Gun.  Prior to forming this band with sister Dee and keyboard player Ross Campbell, Louise, along with sister Dee, performed as backing vocalists for Bourgie Bourgie; a band created by legendary Postcard Records' boss Alan Horne.

In 1989, she provided backing vocals from Phil Thornalley's 1988 only solo album Swamp.

Career

This Mortal Coil

As part of the This Mortal Coil collective, Louise's distinctive voice can be heard on the seminal Filigree & Shadow and Blood albums, and as lead vocalist on The Hope Blister's critically acclaimed 1998 Smile's OK album, all of which were released on the 4AD Records recording label.

Solo and collaborative career
Louise also performed in The Kindness of Strangers, with Moulin Rouge composer Craig Armstrong who was signed to US label Interscope Records, recording the highly regarded album Hope, with tracks produced by the Eurythmics' Dave Stewart and Björk/Madonna cohort Nellee Hooper.

In 2001 she released 6 Songs on her own label, Jock Records, exploring the surreal world of Randy Newman.  Choosing to focus on live performance in small theatre settings, having grown tired of the music 'industry' and wishing to re-connect with music itself, the material of Randy Newman provided the ideal platform.

Following a hiatus from recording of Kate Bush proportions, Louise Rutkowski releases 'Mimi', the first of several 'taster tracks', and the product of a writing partnership with Glaswegian musician Irvin Duguid.  'Mimi' has been mixed by Calum Malcolm, recording engineer with The Blue Nile, and marks a return to the writing of original material by Louise since her music career began in the soul-influenced band Sunset Gun in the 1980s.

Most definitely music for grown ups, 'Mimi' and the tracks that will follow cover subjects ranging from obsession, infidelity, to romantic longing, and trying to survive in an increasingly confused and confusing world.  This new music will establish Louise Rutkowski as the voice of choice for those who have room for music in their collection that suit those more melancholy, introspective and reflective moments life brings.

A new album Diary of a Lost Girl is scheduled for release on 21 February 2014.
Funded by Pledge Music, this is Louise's first solo album to date.

Louise says of the album: "Most of all I envisaged this album as a soundtrack to life for the listener. I remember visiting London when I’d just met Irvin and was listening to the bare bones of "Float", one of the album tracks, and trying to come up with something. I was sitting on the Tube and somehow the music, combined with the motion of the train and watching people sitting thinking as they endured their journey, made me realise that I wanted this to be an album that would be a part of someone's daily life; rather than something they would put on at home. Much as the This Mortal Coil albums were for a lot of fans that have spoken to me over the years, the music should accompany whatever is going on for that person, and hopefully make it easier for them, or help them to come to conclusions. It's a very personal album and I would hope it would become personal for the listener too."

References

External links
 Louise Rutkowski: Official Site
 LOUISE RUTKOWSKI INTERVIEW
 Irvin Duguid
 Sunset Gun Discography – Louise's First band

1964 births
Living people
4AD artists
20th-century Scottish women singers
Musicians from Glasgow
Scottish people of Polish descent